Phasmids are unicellular sensilla in the lateral tail region of certain species of nematodes. They are similar in their structure to amphid sensilla, but smaller. Phasmid neurons were recently shown to function in modulation of chemorepulsion behavior.

References 

Nematode anatomy